A general election was held in the U.S. state of Illinois on November 6, 2018. The elections for Illinois's 18 congressional districts, Governor, statewide constitutional officers, Illinois Senate, and Illinois House were held on this date.

Primaries were held March 20, 2018.

The Democratic Party made gains, including picking up the state's governorship and flipping two of its U.S. House seats. After the election, all executive offices and control of the Illinois General Assembly was held by the Democratic Party. Conversely the Republican Party experienced what was regarded to be their worst defeat in the state since at least 2006.

Election information
2018 was a midterm election year in the United States.

Turnout

Primary election
For the primary election, turnout was 26.48%, with 2,103,634 votes cast. 

Turnout by county

General election
For the general election, turnout was 57.23%, with 4,635,541 votes cast. The Illinois State Board of Elections reported that this general election turnout rate was the third-highest for a midterm election over the past forty years. The Illinois State Board of Elections also reported that the total number of votes cast set a record high. Voter registration, at 8.1 million, also sat at a record high.

Turnout was considered high in the United States during the 2018 midterm elections, with it being the highest national midterm turnout since 1914.

Turnout by county

Federal elections

United States House

All of Illinois' 18 seats in the United States House of Representatives were up for election in 2018.

The Democratic Party flipped two Republican-held seat, making the composition of Illinois' House delegation 13 Democrats and 5 Republicans.

Governor and Lieutenant Governor

Incumbent Republican Governor Bruce Rauner ran for re-election to a second term, but was defeated by Democratic venture capitalist and billionaire J. B. Pritzker.

Democratic primary

Republican primary

General election

Attorney General

Incumbent Democratic Attorney General Lisa Madigan, who served since 2003, chose not to run for re-election to a fifth term. Democratic state Senator Kwame Raoul defeated Republican Erika Harold.

Democratic primary

Republican primary

General election

Secretary of State

Incumbent Democratic Secretary of State Jesse White, who has been in office since 1999, initially announced in August 2015 that he would retire.  On August 17, 2017, White reversed this decision and announced that  he would run for re-election to a sixth term. Governing magazine projected the race as "safe Democratic".

Democratic primary

Candidates

Declared
Jesse White, incumbent Secretary of State

Withdrew
Mike Hastings, state senator

Declined
Walter Burnett Jr., Alderman for Chicago's 27th ward

Results

Republican primary

Candidates

Declared
Jason Helland, Grundy County State’s Attorney

Declined
J.C. Griffin, Iraq War veteran

Results

Endorsements

General election

Results

Comptroller

Incumbent Republican Judy Baar Topinka died on December 10, 2014, after being re-elected to a second term in office. A special election was held in 2016 for the remainder of the term, with Democratic City Clerk of Chicago Susana Mendoza defeating appointed Republican Comptroller Leslie Munger. Mendoza won a full term.

Democratic primary

Candidates

Declared
Susana Mendoza, incumbent Illinois Comptroller

Results

Republican primary

Candidates

Declared
Darlene Senger, former state representative and nominee for Illinois's 11th congressional district in 2014

Results

Third parties and independents

Candidates

Declared
Claire Ball (Libertarian), certified public accountant

General election

Results

Treasurer

Democratic primary

Candidates

Declared
Mike Frerichs, incumbent State Treasurer

Results

Republican primary

Candidates

Declared
Jim Dodge, Orland Park Village Trustee and candidate for Illinois Comptroller in 2010

Results

General election

Results

State Senate

One-third of the seats of the Illinois Senate were up for election in 2018.

State House of Representatives

All of the seats in the Illinois House of Representatives were up for election in 2018.

Judicial elections

Judicial elections were held, consisting of both partisan and retention elections, including those for one seat in the Supreme Court of Illinois and five seats in the Illinois Appellate Court.

Local elections
Local elections took place, including county elections such as the Cook County elections.

Notes

References

External links
Candidates at Vote Smart 
Candidates at Ballotpedia
Campaign finance at OpenSecrets

 
Illinois